The following is a list of ecoregions in Chile as identified by the World Wide Fund for Nature (WWF).

Terrestrial ecoregions

Tropical and subtropical moist broadleaf forests

Rapa Nui and Sala-y-Gomez subtropical broadleaf forests

Temperate broadleaf and mixed forests

 Juan Fernández Islands temperate forests
 Magellanic subpolar forests
 San Felix-San Ambrosio Islands temperate forests
 Valdivian temperate rain forests

Temperate grasslands, savannas, and shrublands

 Patagonian grasslands
 Patagonian steppe

Montane grasslands and shrublands

 Central Andean dry puna
 Southern Andean steppe

Mediterranean forests, woodlands, and scrub

 Chilean matorral

Deserts and xeric shrublands

 Atacama desert
 Sechura desert

Freshwater ecoregions

High Andean Complex

 Bolivian High Andean Complex
 Arid Puna

Atacama/Sechura Complex

 Atacama/Sechura Deserts

Pacific Coastal Desert Complex

 Pacific Coastal Deserts

Mediterranean Chile Complex

 North Mediterranean Chile
 South Mediterranean Chile

Juan Fernández Islands Complex
 
 Juan Fernández Islands

Southern Chile Complex
 
 Valdivian
 Chiloe Island
 Chonos Archipelago
 Magallanes/Ultima Esperanza

Patagonia Complex
 
 Tierra del Fuego-Rio Grande

References
 Olson, D., Dinerstein, E., Canevari, P., Davidson, I., Castro, G., Morisset, V., Abell, R., and Toledo, E.; eds. (1998). Freshwater biodiversity of Latin America and the Caribbean: A conservation assessment. Biodiversity Support Program, Washington, D.C..

 
Chile
Ecoregions
 02